Samuel Chibueze Chukwuka was the Anglican Bishop of Isuikwuato in Aba Province  of the Church of Nigeria.

He was consecrated as the pioneer Bishop of Isuikwuato on 13 March  2005; he had previously been at All Saints' Cathedral, Onitsha.

He retired in 2013.

References 

Anglican bishops of Isuikwuato
21st-century Anglican bishops in Nigeria
Nigerian Anglicans

Possibly living people
Year of birth missing